Emanuel Alberto Pleitez (born December 15, 1982) is an American politician and investor, best known for his candidacy in the 2013 Los Angeles mayoral election. Born and raised in South and East Los Angeles, Pleitez was the first of his family to attend college, graduating from Stanford University in 2006. Emanuel is a combat veteran and continues to serve in the United States Army Reserve. Emanuel is currently the Chairman of the Hispanic Heritage Foundation and Founder of East Los Capital, a technology-enabled private equity firm based in Los Angeles.

Early life and education
Pleitez was born in South Los Angeles and raised in the Eastside neighborhood of El Sereno. He is the son of Mexican and Salvadoran immigrants, brought up along with his younger sister by their single mother.

He attended Woodrow Wilson High School in El Sereno, where he was elected senior class president and earned 19 varsity letters as well as several academic scholarships. He went on to attend Stanford University.

During his time at Stanford, Pleitez was involved in many student groups, including the Hispanic Undergraduate Business Association, ASSU student government, and Alpha Kappa Psi, a professional business fraternity. He also took time off from school to work in the political field; he served as a field organizer on John Kerry's presidential campaign, as well as the special assistant to then-councilman Antonio Villaraigosa during the councilman’s 2005 mayoral race.

While at Stanford, Pleitez was honored with the Jerry I. Porras visionary leadership award and the Cecilia and Tony Burciaga community development award. He graduated from Stanford with a B.A. in urban studies in 2006.

Career
Beginning in 2007, Pleitez worked as a financial analyst at Goldman Sachs. He left Goldman Sachs when President Barack Obama was elected in 2008, after being selected to serve as a member of the  Obama-Biden Presidential Transition Team. He worked specifically on Treasury Department agency review. Following the presidential transition, Pleitez  ran for Congressional Representative of the 32nd District of California against Gil Cedillo and Judy Chu.

After the congressional campaign (which ended in May 2009), Pleitez was appointed to the  President’s Economic Recovery Advisory Board (PERAB) as special assistant to chairman Paul Volcker. There, he "delivered recommendations to President Obama on workforce development, tax reform, financial regulatory reform, infrastructure financing, and residential retrofitting."

In August 2010, Pleitez left his government job to work as a management consultant in the Los Angeles office of McKinsey and Company. He left McKinsey and Company in February 2012 to accept a role as the chief strategy officer of Spokeo, a privately held tech company based in Pasadena. After Spokeo, Emanuel served as a Commissioner for the Los Angeles Fire and Police Pensions and Head of Strategy and Business Development for Qlovi, an education technology startup. Emanuel resigned from the Los Angeles Fire and Police Pensions to train in the U.S. Army Reserve. After U.S. Army training, Emanuel joined the investment team at Sunstone Partners, a Silicon Valley-based private equity firm focused on growth buyout investments in technology-enabled services companies. Emanuel is currently a founder of East Los Capital, a technology-enabled private equity firm.

Emanuel Pleitez has been quoted in the press:
 in Pensions & Investments regarding pension allocations to hedge funds, 
 in PE Hub regarding COVID-19 impact on private equity and venture capital portfolio companies, 
 in PE Hub regarding how private equity dry powder will not save the economy,
 in Mergermarket regarding venture capital-backed companies leaning on non-bank lenders or venture debt firms to stay afloat during COVID-19 environment, and
 in dot.LA regarding LPs using Proposition 209 as the reason why they can't do anything about diversity despite their ability to gather data and be transparent and be sure that the public knows what they are doing. By not emphasizing diversity, public institutions have tipped the scale of wealth toward a class of white asset managers.

Non-profit work
Emanuel Pleitez has been involved in many charitable and non-profit projects. While in school at Stanford he was the program coordinator for El Centro Chicano. He currently serves as the chair of the Hispanic Heritage Foundation. From 2008 to 2014 he served on the board of the Salvadoran American Leadership and Educational Fund (SALEF), serving as the Chairman from a position he still retains. In 2009, he worked as a Development Assistant with the United Farm Workers Foundation.

In 2011, Pleitez founded Inspira, a web series featuring inspirational stories of Latino leaders. He served as the executive producer and host alongside Gabriela Fresquez. He has also served as an advisor to various non-profits, including the New Leaders Council, No Labels, and the Woodrow Wilson High School Alumni Foundation. In 2013, he joined the board of directors of California Children's Academy.

2013 Los Angeles mayoral candidacy
Pleitez announced his mayoral candidacy early in July 2012. He cites a “void in the field of candidates” as well as a desire to “inspire and reenergize LA” and to ”represent those voices asking for integrity, hard work, and fair representation of all Angelenos” as some of his reasons for running.

Pleitez was one of two Latino candidates running for mayor of Los Angeles, and said that he planned on running a competitive and unconventional campaign.  On January 3, 2013, Pleitez qualified for City of Los Angeles matching campaign funds, by raising $150,000 in qualifying campaign contributions prior to December 31, 2012.

Pleitez failed to make the runoff of the 2013 Los Angeles Mayoral Election, placing fifth with 15,263 votes and 4% of the vote in the primary.

References

1982 births
American politicians of Salvadoran descent
Politicians from Los Angeles
21st-century American politicians
Stanford University alumni
Living people
Woodrow Wilson High School (Los Angeles) alumni
Mexican-American people in California politics